The Convention of Tauroggen was an armistice signed 30 December 1812 at Tauroggen (now Tauragė, Lithuania) between General Ludwig Yorck on behalf of his Prussian troops and General Hans Karl von Diebitsch of the Imperial Russian Army. Yorck's act is traditionally considered a turning point of Prussian history, triggering an insurgency against Napoleon in the Rheinbund.

Background
According to the Treaty of Paris, Prussia had to support Napoleon's invasion of Russia. This resulted in some Prussians leaving their army to avoid serving the French, among them Carl von Clausewitz, who joined Russian service. Between October and December, Yorck received numerous Russian requests to switch sides. He forwarded these to Berlin, but received no instructions.

When Yorck's immediate French superior, Marshal Jacques MacDonald, retreated from the siege of Riga (1812) before the corps of Diebitsch, Yorck found himself isolated and eventually surrounded. As a soldier his duty was to break through, but as a Prussian patriot his position was more difficult. He had to judge whether the moment was favorable for starting a war of liberation; and, whatever might be the enthusiasm of his junior staff-officers, Yorck had no illusions as to the safety of his own head, and negotiated with Clausewitz. While negotiations were ongoing at Tauroggen on 26 December, Yorck sent the king's adjutant, Major Wilhelm Henckel von Donnersmarck, back to Berlin via Königsberg, there to inform General Friedrich Wilhelm von Bülow about the impending Russian truce. On 29 December, Donnersmarck told Bülow that Yorck had separated his forces from the French and that an agreement with Russia was at hand; the French should be treated as enemies. In fact, the French headquarters were at Königsberg. The French commander, Joachim Murat, informed Bülow of Yorck's treason on 1 January. Later that day a letter arrived by messenger from Yorck himself.

Terms
The Convention of Tauroggen, signed by Diebitsch and Yorck, "neutralized" the Prussian corps without consent of their king. It also left the East Prussian border completely undefended. The news was received with the wildest enthusiasm in Prussia, but the Prussian court dared not yet throw off the mask, and an order was dispatched suspending Yorck from his command pending a court-martial. Diebitsch refused to let the bearer pass through his lines, and the general was finally absolved when the Treaty of Kalisz definitely ranged Prussia on the side of the Allies.

Aftermath
Between 1 January, when Murat moved his headquarters west to Elbing, and 3 January, when Marshal MacDonald, Yorck's superior, arrived in Königsberg, Bülow worked feverishly to move his supplies to Graudenz and about 5,000 men to Kreuzberg, where he arrived on 2 January. On 9 January he retreated west across the Vistula, ceding East Prussia to the retreating French and advancing Russians. On 5 January, Yorck had sent his last messenger to Berlin. On 8 January, he arrived at Königsberg with the Russian general Ludwig Adolf von Wittgenstein. Yorck reaffirmed his commitment to the armistice, but refused Wittgenstein's demand that he fight the French. That day, however, the king's messengers arrived to dismiss Yorck from his command and repudiate his armistice. Yorck refused and in a letter to Bülow on 13 January, he questioned if he had "sunk so deep that he fears to break the chains of slavery, the chains that we have meekly carried for five years?" He declared it "the time to regain our freedom and honour" and protested that he was "a true Prussian".

Notes

References

External sources

Tauroggen
1812 treaties
Tauroggen
Tauroggen
1812 in Prussia
1812 in the Russian Empire
Prussia–Russia relations
Bilateral treaties of Russia